The 2015 Open Féminin de Marseille was a professional tennis tournament played on outdoor clay courts. It was the eighteenth edition of the tournament and part of the 2015 ITF Women's Circuit, offering a total of $100,000 in prize money. It took place in Marseille, France, on 1–7 June 2015.

Singles main draw entrants

Seeds 

 1 Rankings as of 25 May 2015

Other entrants 
The following players received wildcards into the singles main draw:
  Clothilde de Bernardi
  Amandine Hesse
  Chloé Paquet
  Caroline Roméo

The following players received entry from the qualifying draw:
  Oksana Kalashnikova
  Alizé Lim
  Anastasija Sevastova
  Constance Sibille

Champions

Singles

 Monica Niculescu def.  Pauline Parmentier, 6–2, 7–5

Doubles

 Tatiana Búa /  Laura Thorpe def.  Nicole Melichar /  Maryna Zanevska, 6–3, 3–6, [10–6]

External links 
 2015 Open Féminin de Marseille at ITFtennis.com
 Official website

2015 ITF Women's Circuit
2015
2015 in French tennis
June 2015 sports events in France